Group Captain John Hamar Hill,  (28 December 1912 – 21 July 1998) was a British Royal Air Force officer, who commanded No. 222 Squadron RAF during the Battle of Britain.

Early life
Hill was born on 28 December 1912 and educated at Dover College, where he had been a college prefect and a good games player.

RAF career
Hill took a commission in the Royal Air Force (RAF) in 1932. By 1940 he had taken command of No. 504 Squadron RAF, a Hurricane squadron. He was shot down over France and wounded in a famous incident where he was mistaken for a spy. After recovering from these injuries he was given command of No. 222 Squadron RAF, whose Spitfires suffered heavy losses in the Battle of Britain.

Later in the war Hill was appointed chief flying instructor at No. 57 Operational Training Unit and then Station Commander at RAF Exeter and RAF Church Stanton. In 1942 he was mentioned in despatches and posted to New Zealand as an Air Staff Officer. The end of the war saw Hill at Supreme Headquarters Allied Expeditionary Force, where he was promoted group captain. He was appointed a Commander of the Order of the British Empire in 1946.

After the war Hill was seconded to the French Air Ministry in 1950 and ended his career as Director of Command and Staff Training and then Senior Personnel Staff Officer. He retired in 1960 and became the Export Officer of the Society of British Aerospace Companies and a VIP co-ordinator at the Farnborough Air Show. He died in 1998.

References
 Dover College Register
 https://web.archive.org/web/20090105180803/http://www.bbm.org.uk/Hilljh.htm

1912 births
1998 deaths
Commanders of the Order of the British Empire
Royal Air Force officers
Royal Air Force pilots of World War II
The Few